Double Exposure is an album by vocalist Chris Connor and trumpeter/bandleader Maynard Ferguson featuring tracks recorded in late 1960 and early 1961 which was originally released on the Atlantic label.

Reception 

The contemporaneous DownBeat reviewer commented: "Connor is in good voice throughout, and the band is in fine fettle". AllMusic reviewer Scott Yanow stated "With the exception of trumpeter Ferguson, there are few significant solos, and the big band mostly acts as an ensemble. Both Connor and MF were Kenton alumni, and there are moments where the orchestra reminds one of that band, but the focus is mostly on the singer ... although one wishes there was more interplay with the orchestra".

Track listing 
 "Summertime" (George Gershwin, Ira Gershwin, DuBose Heyward) – 3:14
 "I Only Have Eyes for You" (Al Dubin, Harry Warren) – 2:38
 "It Never Entered My Mind" (Richard Rodgers, Lorenz Hart) – 5:09
 "Two Ladies in de Shade of de Banana Tree" (Harold Arlen, Truman Capote) – 2:38
 "Spring Can Really Hang You Up the Most" (Tommy Wolf, Fran Landesman) – 4:15
 "The Lonesome Road" (Nathaniel Shilkret, Gene Austin) – 4:24
 "All The Things You Are" (Jerome Kern, Oscar Hammerstein II) – 2:49
 "Black Coffee" (Sonny Burke, Paul Francis Webster) – 3:41
 "Happy New Year" (Gordon Jenkins, Chuck Collins) – 4:27
 "That's How It Went All Right" (André Previn, Dory Langdon) – 3:10
Recorded in New York City on December 5, 1960 (tracks 4, 6 & 9), December 14, 1960 (tracks 3, 5, 7 & 8) and January 23, 1961 (tracks 1, 2 & 10)

Personnel 
Chris Connor – vocals
Maynard Ferguson – trumpet, trombone, French horn
Bill Berry, Rolf Ericson, Chet Ferretti – trumpet
Kenny Rupp, Ray Winslow – trombone
Lanny Morgan – alto saxophone, flute
Willie Maiden – tenor saxophone, clarinet
Joe Farrell – tenor saxophone, soprano saxophone, flute
Frank Hittner – baritone saxophone, bass clarinet
Jaki Byard – piano
John Neves – bass
Rufus Jones – drums
Willie Maiden (tracks 5 & 7), Don Sebesky (tracks 1–4, 6 & 8–10) – arranger

References 

1961 albums
Chris Connor albums
Maynard Ferguson albums
Atlantic Records albums
Albums produced by Nesuhi Ertegun
Albums arranged by Don Sebesky
Collaborative albums